Qaleh-ye Rostam (also Romanized as Qal‘eh-ye Rostam and Qal‘eh Rostam) is a village in Silakhor-e Sharqi Rural District, in the Central District of Azna County, Lorestan Province, Iran. At the 2006 census, its population was 658, in 130 families.

References 

Towns and villages in Azna County